Life in Stereo is the fifth studio album by the Spanish electronic indie pop band The Pinker Tones. It was released on 15 May 2012 under label between Nacional Records and Outstanding Records.

Track listing

References

The Pinker Tones albums
2012 albums